Guillaume Gallienne (born 8 February 1972) is a French actor, screenwriter and film director. He has received two Molière Awards for his stagework and has won two César Awards, one for writing and the other for his performance in his autobiographical comedy film Me, Myself and Mum (2013).

Early life 
Gallienne was born in Paris to French businessman Jean-Claude and Russian-Georgian aristocrat Melitta Gallienne, the third of four sons. From the age of 10, he attended La Salle Passy Buzenval where he was bullied for his effeminate personality. Two years later, after a nervous breakdown, he was sent to St John's College near Portsmouth in England. The death of a close cousin convinced him to take up acting at the age of 19. He attended Cours Florent for three years before studying under Daniel Mesguich, Stéphane Braunschweig and Dominique Valadié at the French National Academy of Dramatic Arts, graduating in 1998.

Career 
Gallienne made his film debut in 1992 in Tableau d'honneur and he has starred in Sofia Coppola's 2006 film Marie Antoinette. Between 2008 and 2010, he had a short sketch segment entitled Les Bonus de Guillaume on Le Grand Journal, parodying DVD bonus features. He won a Molière Award for Best Newcomer in 2010 in his one-man stage show Boys and Guillaume, to the table! (Les Garçons et Guillaume, à table!) and another for Best Supporting Actor in 2011 in Un fil à la patte. He collaborated with choreographer Nicolas Le Riche to write the libretto for the 2011 Paris Opera Ballet production of Caligula. He adapted Bolshoi Ballet's 2014 Parisian production of Illusions perdues, choreographed by Alexei Ratmansky.

His 2013 film Me, Myself and Mum, an adaptation of his stage show, was screened in the Directors' Fortnight section at the 2013 Cannes Film Festival where it won the top prize (Art Cinema Award) and the Prix SACD. The film was nominated for ten Césars, the most in 2014, winning five in total. Individually, he was awarded the César Award for Best Actor and the César Award for Best Writing.

Gallienne has been a member (Sociétaire) of the Comédie-Française company since 2005, having first entered in 1998. He became a Knight of the National Order of Merit in November 2008 and an Officer of the Order of Arts and Letters at the start of 2013. He has hosted a weekly literature show Ça peut pas faire de mal on France Inter since September 2009.

Personal life
In 2001, Guillaume met his wife Amandine, a stylist, whom he married in 2005.

Filmography

As actor

Film
1992: Tableau d'honneur (by Charles Nemes): Castagnier
1995: Sabrina (by Sydney Pollack): Assistant
1996: Un samedi sur la terre (by Diane Bertrand): Apprenti bijoutier
1997: Jeunesse (by Noël Alpi): Le lyonnais
1997: La Leçon de tango (The Tango Lesson) (by Sally Potter): Pablo's Friend
 1999: Monsieur Naphtali by Olivier Schatzky: Sommergan
 1999: Une pour toutes by Claude Lelouch: L'agent immobilier
 2000: Jet Set by Fabien Onteniente: Evrard Sainte-Croix
 2003: Fanfan la tulipe by Gérard Krawczyk: Aimé Bonaventure Claudion Dominique de La Houlette
 2003: Monsieur Ibrahim et les fleurs du Coran by François Dupeyron: Le Vendeur de voitures
 2004: Narco by Tristan Aurouet & Gilles Lellouche: Samuel Pupkin
 2005: Tu vas rire, mais je te quitte by Philippe Harel: Pierre-Louis
 2006: Fauteuils d'orchestre by Danièle Thompson: Pascal
 2006: Marie-Antoinette by Sofia Coppola: Comte Vergennes
 2006: La Jungle by Mathieu Delaporte: Mathias Warkhevytch
2006: Mon colonel (by Laurent Herbiet) - Sous-préfet
 2007: Le Candidat by Niels Arestrup: Sam
 2007: Benjamin Gates et le livre des secrets (National Treasure 2) by Jon Turteltaub: Un officier de police à bicyclette
 2008: Sagan by Diane Kurys: Jacques Quoirez
 2008: Musée haut, musée bas by Jean-Michel Ribes: Max Perdelli
 2009: Le Concert by Radu Mihaileanu: un critique
 2010: Ensemble, nous allons vivre une très, très grande histoire d'amour... by Pascal Thomas: Hubert
 2010: L'Italien by Olivier Baroux: Jacques
 2012: Confession d'un enfant du siècle by Sylvie Verheyde: Mercanson
 2012: Astérix et Obélix: Au service de Sa Majesté by Laurent Tirard: Jolitorax
 2013: Les garçons et Guillaume, à table ! by Guillaume Gallienne: Guillaume et la mère de Guillaume
 2014: Yves Saint Laurent by Jalil Lespert: Pierre Bergé
 2016: Down by Love by Pierre Godeau: Jean Firmino
 2016: Cézanne and I by Danièle Thompson: Paul Cézanne
 2021: Kaamelott: The First Chapter by Alexandre Astier: Alzagar
 2021: The French Dispatch by Wes Anderson: Mr. B

Short films 
 1994: Les Flammes du désespoir by Guillaume Husson
 1996: Putain de voleuses by Edy Garbarski
 1996: Sans doute lui by Shiri Tsour
 1997: Fils de personne by Niels Dubost
 1998: Pop-corn by Yannick Rolandeau: Troisième badaud
 1999: Mon plus beau mariage by Guillaume Husson: Le prêtre
 2001: Le Cœur sur la main by Marie-Anne Chazel: Le snob
 2001: En scène ! by Yvon Marciano
 2001: L'Élu de Fouad Benamou
 2006: Le Dernier Épisode de Dallas by Guillaume Husson: François
 2009: L'Invitation by Niels Arestrup

Television 
 1995: Navarro (1 episode)
 2002: Patron sur mesure by Stéphane Clavier: Leduc
 2002: Les Frangines by Laurence Katrian: Edouard
 2003: La Bête du Gévaudan by Patrick Volson: L'abbé Pourcher
 2003: Maigret (1 episode)
 2006: Monsieur Max by Gabriel Aghion: Max Jacob jeune
 2007: Elles et moi by Bernard Stora: Robert
 2008: Adieu De Gaulle, adieu by Laurent Herbiet: Bernard Tricot
 2008–2010: Les Bonus de Guillaume (short program on Canal+)
 2011: Hard (TV series – season 2) by Cathy Verney: himself
 2017: Oblomov: Oblomov. He was also the director of the film
 2021: La Vengeance au Triple Galop (TV film) by Alex Lutz and Arthur Sanigou: Claude Marquinnier
 TBA: The Palace (HBO Miniseries) by Stephen Frears; Filming

DVD 
2009: Les Bonus de Guillaume
2011: Les Bonus de Guillaume, Volume 2

Voice over 
2005: L'homme de la lune (short film) by Serge Elissalde: voice of Lazare
2006: U by Serge Elissalde & Grégoire Solotareff: voice of Lazare
2010: Le Voyage extraordinaire de Samy by Ben Stassen: voice of Alphonse le chat
2010–2013: The Little Prince (TV series) by Pierre Alain Chartier: voice of Serpent
2012: Sammy 2 by Ben Stassen: voice of Lulu la moustache
2014: M. Peabody et Sherman: Les Voyages dans le temps by Rob Minkoff: voice of M. Peabody (V. F. de Ty Burrell)
2014: Paddington: voice of the bear: Paddington (V. 0. by Ben Whishaw)

Honours 
 Chevalier of the Ordre National du Mérite (2008)
 Molière Award for Best Newcomer in Les Garçons et Guillaume, à table! (2010)
 Molière Award for Best Supporting Actor in Un fil à la patte (2011)
 Officier of the Ordre des Arts et des Lettres (2013)
 Lumières Award for Best Actor in Me, Myself and Mum (2014)
 César Award for Best Actor in Me, Myself and Mum (2014)
 César Award for Best Writing in Me, Myself and Mum (2014)
 Globes de Cristal Award for Best Actor in Me, Myself and Mum (2014)

References

External links 

1972 births
Living people
People from Neuilly-sur-Seine
French people of Russian descent
French people of Georgian descent
French male film actors
French male stage actors
French film directors
Best Actor César Award winners
Best Actor Lumières Award winners
Sociétaires of the Comédie-Française
Officiers of the Ordre des Arts et des Lettres
French National Academy of Dramatic Arts alumni
Cours Florent alumni
French male screenwriters
French screenwriters
French film producers
20th-century French male actors
21st-century French male actors